Energio José Díaz Quiñónez (born September 15, 1969) is a retired footballer from Ecuador, who played as a striker during his career.

International career
He obtained five caps for the Ecuador national football team in 1995, scoring three goals, including one at the 1995 Copa América.

Honour

Nation
 
 Korea Cup: 1995

Individual
Korea Cup Most Valuable Player: 1995

References

1969 births
Living people
Association football forwards
Ecuadorian footballers
Ecuador international footballers
1995 Copa América players
Delfín S.C. footballers
C.D. Cuenca footballers
Jeonnam Dragons players
L.D.U. Quito footballers
Ecuadorian expatriate footballers
Expatriate footballers in Peru
Expatriate footballers in South Korea
K League 1 players
Ecuadorian expatriate sportspeople in Peru